A wax fire is created when melted or boiling wax is doused with water. The ensuing reaction creates a large fireball or dramatically enlarges the flame of the already existing fire. Only a small amount of wax and water is needed to create a wax fire.

Chemistry behind the reaction

Following the basic rules of the fire triangle, for a reaction to take place, three ingredients are required: oxygen, fuel, and heat. In the case of wax melted down, only the top surface has access to oxygen, so the fire progresses slowly. When water is added to the wax, two things happen. Firstly, the water — being denser than wax — sinks to the bottom of the container. Secondly, as burning wax quickly reaches a temperature of well over 200 degrees C, the water instantly vapourises. When water changes from a liquid to a gas, there is more than a thousand-fold increase in volume. The water expands violently, and throws the hot wax layer above it into the air as small droplets. The wax now has a much bigger surface area exposed to oxygen so combustion takes place very quickly.

For similar reasons, water should never be used to extinguish burning grease or fat, which both behave similarly to wax. Water is ineffective at putting out other flammable liquid fires, but in most liquids (e.g. petrol), the water remains as a liquid, and spreads the fire by allowing the liquid to float and burn on top of it. Baking soda more effectively extinguishes a wax fire.

See also
Wax boiling, also known as wax burning
Chip pan fire
Boilover

External links

http://www.physicsforums.com/archive/index.php/t-83794.html
http://www.angliacampus.com/education/fire/secondar/fire.htm

Articles containing video clips 
Types of fire